Bernardino de Mendoza (c. 1540 – 3 August 1604) was a Spanish military commander, diplomat and writer on military history and politics.

Biography
Bernardino de Mendoza was born in Guadalajara, Spain around 1540, as the son of Don Alonso Suarez de Mendoza, third Count of Coruña and Viscount of Torija, and Doña Juana Jimenez de Cisneros.
In 1560, he joined the army of Philip II and for more than 15 years fought, he in the Low Countries under the command of Fernando Álvarez de Toledo, Duke of Alba. During that period, he participated in the Spanish military actions at (among others) Haarlem, Mookerheyde and Gembloux. In 1576, he was appointed a member of the military Order of St. James (Orden militar de Santiago) in recognition of those military achievements.

In 1578, Philip II sent Mendoza as his ambassador to London. There, he acted not only as diplomat but also as a spy, using a variety of secret codes in the reports that he returned to Spain. He was expelled from England in 1584, after his involvement in Francis Throckmorton's plot against Elizabeth I was revealed. Crucial to that plot was his correspondence with Philip II, using a code known only to himself and the king that they had learnt years earlier. "He had been unceremoniously set aboard a ship and returned to the custody of his master because his plots 'disturbed the realm of England'. 'Tell your mistress,'he said at the last, to the councillors who saw him aboard, 'that Bernardion de Mendoza was born not to disturb kingdoms but to conquer them.' "

For the next six years, Bernardino de Mendoza served as Spanish ambassador to the King of France. As the effective agent of Philip's interventionist foreign policy, Mendoza acted in concert with the Catholic League for which he acted as paymaster by funnelling to the Guise faction Habsburg funds; he encouraged it to try, by popular riots, assassinations and military campaigns, to undercut any moderate Catholic party that offered a policy of rapprochement with the Huguenots. The militant Mendoza and his master considered them as nothing more than heretics who needed to be crushed and rooted out like an infection. His role in backing the extremist Catholic House of Guise became so public that King Henry III demanded his recall.

In 1591, with the Catholic League in disarray after the assassination of Henry I, Duke of Guise, he resigned for ill health. His eyesight had been deteriorating for years, and by the time of his return to Spain, he had become completely blind. His last years were spent in his house in Madrid.

Many of his dispatches to Madrid were first deciphered only in the Simancas archives by De Lamar Jensen; they revealed, for the first time, Mendoza's role in organising and co-ordinating the Paris riots led by the Duke of Guise, known as the Day of the Barricades (12 May 1588), which had been presented as a spontaneous rising of the people and timed to coincide with the sailing of the Spanish Armada. Among Mendoza's public writings is a famous account of the war in the Low Countries that is entitled Comentario de lo sucecido en los Paises Bajos desde el año 1567 hasta el de 1577. Bernardino also published a book on the art of warfare, under the title Theórica y práctica de la guerra and a Spanish translation of the Politicorum sive civilis doctrinae libri sex of the Flemish philosopher Justus Lipsius.

Notes

References
 Cortijo Ocaña, Antonio, & Á. Gómez Moreno. Bernardino de Mendoza. Comentario de lo sucecido en las Guerras de los Países Bajos. Madrid: Ministerio de Defensa, 2008.
Miguel Cabañas Agrela (ed.), Bernardino de Mendoza, un escritor soldado al servicio de la monarquía católica (1540-1604), Diputación de Guadalajara: 2001.
De Lamar Jensen. "Diplomacy and Dogmatism: Bernardino de Mendoza and the French Catholic League," Cambridge MA, Harvard University Press, 1964.
For a translation into modern English of his Theórica y prática de guerra (Madrid: Pedro Madigal, 1595), Beatrice Heuser: The Strategy Makers: Thoughts on War and Society from Machiavelli to Clausewitz (Santa Monica, CA: Greenwood/Praeger, 2010), pp. 87–102.

External links
 Biography of Bernardino de Mendoza by Prof. Dr. Antonio Herrera Casado.

1540s births
1604 deaths
People from Guadalajara, Jalisco
Ambassadors of Spain to France
Ambassadors of Spain to England
Spanish essayists
Spanish male writers
Spanish generals
Spanish translators
Spanish politicians
Spanish military writers
16th-century Spanish writers
16th-century male writers
17th-century Spanish people
16th-century soldiers
16th-century Spanish diplomats
Male essayists